Government Arts College is an arts and science college located in Ooty in the Nilgiris district, Tamil Nadu, India. The college is located in a locale called Stone house hill named after the landmark building Stone House.

History
Government Arts College, Ooty was established in 1955 under the University of Madras. The present building of the college was the summer secretariat of the British Madras Presidency.

Academic Programmes
The college offers undergraduates and postgraduate programmes in arts and science affiliated to the Bharathiar University. The college has been accredited by National Assessment and Accreditation Council with the B Grade.

Notable alumni
Vani Bhojan, Actress

External links

References

Arts colleges in India
Education in Ooty
Colleges affiliated to Bharathiar University
Academic institutions formerly affiliated with the University of Madras
Educational institutions established in 1955
1955 establishments in Madras State